The Unification Pavilion is a venue for peace talks between North and South Korea. The building is situated in the Joint Security Area on the North side of the Military Demarcation Line bisecting the area. Before the Korean War, the village, named Panmunjom, consisted of householders.

Overview 

Situated on the North Korean side of the Military Demarcation Line is the Unification (Tongil) Pavilion, also used as a venue for non-military, diplomatic meetings. Closed-circuit television and microphones are installed in the meeting room of the North-South Talks, so that the situation can be monitored in real time in Pyongyang.

A portion of the Unification Pavilion has also been used for North Korean military personnel office space.

Events
On January 9, 2018, Kwon Hyok Bong, director of the Arts and Performance Bureau in North Korea's Culture Ministry, and Hyon Song-wol, North Korea's deputy chief delegate for the talks, met with South Korean counterparts at Peace House then on January 15 at Unification pavilion to discuss inter-Korean participation in the 2018 Winter Olympics in Pyeongchang, South Korea.
May 2018 inter-Korean summit took place on May 26.

See also
 Phanmun Pavilion
 Inter-Korean Peace House
 Inter-Korean House of Freedom
 Sunshine Policy
 Northern Limit Line
 April 2018 inter-Korean summit
 May 2018 inter-Korean summit

References

Politics of Korea
2018 in North Korea
2018 in South Korea
2018 in international relations
1969 establishments in North Korea
North Korea–South Korea relations
Panmunjom
20th-century architecture in North Korea